The UK Singles Chart is one of many music charts compiled by the Official Charts Company that calculates the best-selling singles of the week in the United Kingdom. Since 2004 the chart has been based on the sales of both physical singles and digital downloads, with airplay figures excluded from the official chart.  This list shows singles that peaked in the Top 10 of the UK Singles Chart during 2008, as well as singles which peaked in 2007 and 2009 but were in the top 10 in 2008. The entry date is when the single appeared in the top 10 for the first time (week ending, as published by the Official Charts Company, which is six days after the chart is announced).

One-hundred and twenty-two singles were in the top ten in 2008. Nine singles from 2007 remained in the top 10 for several weeks at the beginning of the year, while "Broken Strings" by James Morrison and Nelly Furtado was released in 2008 but did not reach its peak until 2009. "Crank That" by Soulja Boy was the only song from 2007 to reach its peak in 2008. Twenty-nine artists scored multiple entries in the top 10 in 2008. Adele, Flo Rida, Katy Perry, Kings of Leon, The Script and The Saturdays were among the many artists who achieved their first UK charting top 10 single in 2008.

The 2007 Christmas number-one, "When You Believe" by 2007 X Factor winner Leon Jackson, remained at number-one for the first two weeks of 2008. The first new number-one single of the year was "Now You're Gone" by Basshunter featuring DJ Mental Theo's Bazzheadz. Overall, twenty different singles peaked at number-one in 2008, with Alexandra Burke (2) having the most singles hit that position (including her credit on "Hero" with The X Factor Finalists 2008).

Background

Multiple entries
One-hundred and twenty-two singles charted in the top 10 in 2008, with one-hundred and twelve singles reaching their peak this year. Two versions of the Leonard Cohen song "Hallelujah" - Alexandra Burke's X Factor winners single and Jeff Buckley's 1994 recording which was re-released in 2007 - reached the top 10.

Twenty-nine artists scored multiple entries in the top 10 in 2008. Cheryl Cole, Leona Lewis and Rihanna shared the record for most top 10 hits in 2008 with four hit singles each.

Chart debuts
Fifty-three artists achieved their first top 10 single in 2008, either as a lead or featured artist. Of these, eight went on to record another hit single that year: Alexandra Burke, Basshunter, Duffy, Geraldine McQueen, Katy Perry, Kings of Leon, The Saturdays and The Ting Tings.

The following table (collapsed on desktop site) does not include acts who had previously charted as part of a group and secured their first top 10 solo single.

Notes
Chris Martin had his first official credit outside Coldplay (aside from the Band Aid 20 charity single in 2004) singing vocals on Kanye West's "Homecoming" which peaked at number 9. Alex Turner from The Last Shadow Puppets had previous chart success as part of the Arctic Monkeys but "The Age of the Understatement" was his first chart entry with his new group.

Frankie Sandford and Rochelle Humes of The Saturdays were formerly members of S Club Juniors (later known as S Club 8) who had multiple top 10 entries in 2002 and 2003. Peter Kay, who played the character Geraldine McQueen, had previous chart credits on "Is This the Way to Amarillo in 2005 and "(I'm Gonna Be) 500 Miles" in 2007, but "The Winner's Song" was his first entry as McQueen.

Estelle had her first chart hit in 2008 on "American Boy" with Kanye West but she was a vocalist on the number-one Band Aid 20 single "Do They Know It's Christmas?" in 2004. Alexandra Burke sang on "Hero" with her fellow X Factor series five contestants prior to her debut solo hit "Hallelujah". JLS and Diana Vickers would both go on to record number-one singles in later years.

Alesha Dixon recorded her first solo top 10 in 2008, "The Boy Does Nothing" which peaked at number five. Her previous chart entries were as part of girl group Mis-Teeq. After chart success with The White Stripes and The Raconteurs, Jack White peaked at number 9 with his solo single "Another Way to Die" with Alicia Keys, recorded for the Quantum of Solace soundtrack.

Songs from films
Original songs from various films entered the top 10 throughout the year. These included "Low" (from Step Up 2: The Streets), "You Make It Real" (He's Just Not That Into You) and "Another Way to Die" (Quantum of Solace).

Charity singles
A number of singles recorded for charity reached the top 10 in the charts in 2008. The Sport Relief single was "Footprints in the Sand" by Leona Lewis, which was released as a double-A side single with "Better in Time". It peaked at number two on 22 March 2008 after a performance on the telethon.

The finalists from the fifth series of The X Factor (which included winner Alexandra Burke, JLS and Diana Vickers) got together for a single, "Hero", which had been a hit for Mariah Carey. It reached number one on 8 November 2008, with profits going to benefit Help for Heroes and The Royal British Legion.

McFly's official Children in Need single for 2008, "Do Ya/Stay with Me", only reached number 18 in the chart. However Sir Terry Wogan and Aled Jones ranked at number 3 with a cover version of "Peace on Earth/Little Drummer Boy", originally by David Bowie and Bing Crosby, for the same cause on 20 December 2008.

Best-selling singles
Alexandra Burke had the best-selling single of the year with "Hallelujah". The song spent five weeks in the top 10 (including three weeks at number one), sold over 887,000 copies and was certified platinum by the BPI. "Hero" by The X Factor Finalists 2008 came in second place, selling more than 751,000 copies and losing out by around 136,000 sales. Duffy's "Mercy", "I Kissed a Girl" from Katy Perry and "Rockstar" by Nickelback made up the top five. Singles by Estelle featuring Kanye West, Kings of Leon, Basshunter, Madonna featuring Justin Timberlake & Timbaland and Sam Sparro were also in the top ten best-selling singles of the year.

"Hallelujah" (5) was also ranked in the top 10 best-selling singles of the decade.

Top-ten singles
Key

Entries by artist

The following table shows artists who achieved two or more top 10 entries in 2008, including singles that reached their peak in 2007 or 2009. The figures include both main artists and featured artists, while appearances on ensemble charity records are also counted for each artist. The total number of weeks an artist spent in the top ten in 2008 is also shown.

Notes

 "There You'll Be" originally peaked at number 3 when it was released in 2001.
 Figure includes two hit singles with the group Coldplay.
 Figure includes song that peaked in 2007.
 Figure includes single as part of The X Factor Finalists 2008.
 Figure includes song that peaked in 2009.
 Figure includes three hit singles with the group Girls Aloud.
 Released as an official single for Children in Need and featured on the BandAged CD. 
 Released as the official single for Sport Relief.
 Figure includes appearance on Madonna's "4 Minutes".
 Figure includes appearance on T.I.'s "Live Your Life".
 Figure includes appearance on Estelle's "American Boy".
 Figure includes appearance on Kanye West's "Homecoming".

See also
2008 in British music
List of number-one singles from the 2000s (UK)

References
General

Specific

External links
2008 singles chart archive at the Official Charts Company (click on relevant week)

United Kingdom Top 10 singles
2008 in British music
2008